Julio Cortázar (1914–1984), was an Argentine author.

Cortázar or Cortazar may also refer to:

People
David Fernández Cortázar (born 1985), Spanish footballer
Eider Merino Cortazar (born 1994), Spanish racing cyclist
Ernesto Cortázar II, (1940–2004), Mexican composer
Estanislao Tovilla Cortázar (1936–1994), Mexican civil engineer
Esteban Cortázar (born 1984), Colombian fashion designer
Luis de Cortázar (fl. 1837–1839), governor of the Mexican state of Guanajuato
Maximiliano Cortázar (born 1966), Mexican politician
Octavio Cortázar (1935–2008), Cuban film director and screenwriter
Roberto Cortázar (born 1962), Mexican painter

Places
Cortazar, Guanajuato, Mexico